Bankfoot is a village in Perth and Kinross, Scotland, approximately  north of Perth and  south of Dunkeld. Bankfoot had a population of 1,136 in 2001. In the 2011 Census the population of Bankfoot was 1,110 people with there being a slightly higher number of male residents (51.4%) than female residents (48.6%). It was found that 33% of Bankfoot residents were aged 60 or older.

Education

The village has a primary school – Auchtergaven Primary School – which is named after the Church of Scotland parish of Auchtergaven, in which Bankfoot resides.

Pubs and hotels
The village has two licensed premises: the Bankfoot Inn and the Atholl Inn. The Bankfoot Inn is a restored 18th-century coaching inn which has a public bar with real ales, a lounge bar with fire and a restaurant.  The inn hosts live music every month and also hosts a weekly "open session", to which musicians can bring an instrument and join in. The inn also has bedrooms.  The Atholl is further north on the main street and also serves food.

Public spaces
The Bankfoot Church Centre opened in October 2008 to replace the nineteenth century church building which was destroyed by fire in February 2004.  The building is used every day by many groups, fitting its tag line during the build "Bankfoot Church and Community Building Together".

Sport

Football
Bankfoot was home to the junior football club Bankfoot Athletic.

Other sports

Bankfoot has a tennis club with two courts, a badminton club and a bowling club, which hosted the Caledonia Challenge Cup in August 2010.

Public transport

Train

Until 1931 Bankfoot had a railway station, Bankfoot railway station, which was on the branch line to and from Perth railway station.

Bus
The service was taken over in 1946 by A&C McLennan of Spittalfield. Permission to use double decker buses was granted in 1950. In 1952, the fare was 5 shillings single and 10 shillings return, with gradual increases to 8 shillings single and one farthing return by 1963. By 1966, the service operated only on the first Sunday of each month. Service was withdrawn in 1967, although A&C McLennan was still in operation in 1969.

Notable residents
 Miles Briggs - MSP
 Jessie Margaret King (1862–?), writer

See also
List of places in Perth and Kinross

References